Rustom B. Damania (died 25 March 2001) was a professor at the Indian Institute of Science and Technology. He is credited with the development of NAL's Light Canard Research Aircraft, which later became DRDO Rustom.

References

Academic staff of the Indian Institute of Science
Indian aerospace engineers
Deaths from multiple myeloma